Daniel Grafton Hill III  (November 23, 1923 – June 26, 2003) was a Canadian sociologist, civil servant, human rights specialist, and Black Canadian historian.

An American born in Missouri and raised in the western United States, Hill went to Canada for graduate work in sociology at University of Toronto, and decided to settle there. He and his American wife both became Canadian citizens and their three children were born and raised there.

Biography
Born in Independence, Missouri, Hill grew up in the western United States as the son of Daniel Grafton Hill II and his wife. His father, born in Washington, DC, and paternal grandfather were both university-educated men who became ordained ministers of the African Methodist Episcopal Church. It was the first independent black denomination in the United States, founded in 1816 in Philadelphia, Pennsylvania.

One of Hill's paternal aunts was Violet Hill Whyte, the first of his father's nine siblings. She was a public school teacher before 1937, when she was the first black to be appointed as an officer in the Baltimore Police Department in Maryland.

In 1948, Hill graduated with a BA from Howard University, a historically black university in Washington, DC. While in the capital, he met his future wife, a woman from Oak Park, Illinois. In 1950, he moved to Canada to study sociology at the University of Toronto. He received an M.A. in 1951 and a Ph.D in 1960. Already teaching at the university, he and his wife decided to make their home in Toronto.

In 1953, he had married Donna Mae Bender (1928–2018), a former Senate staffer and civil rights activist, whom he had met in Washington, DC. They settled in Toronto that year. They had three children together, all born in Canada: singer-songwriter Dan Hill, author Lawrence Hill, and poet and novelist Karen Hill (1958–2014).

In the early 1950s in Toronto, Donna Hill worked as a human rights activist for the city's Labour Committee for Human Rights. She lobbied the Ontario government to enact anti-discrimination legislation.  She also wrote about Black Canadian history; her A Black Man's Toronto, 1914–1980: The Reminiscences of Harry Gairey (1980) was published by the Multicultural History Society of Ontario.

From 1955 to 1958, Hill was a researcher for the Social Planning Council of Metropolitan Toronto. From 1958 to 1960, he was Executive Secretary of the North York Social Planning Council. In 1960, he was the assistant director of the Alcoholism and Drug Addiction Research Foundation. From 1961 to 1962, he taught in the department of sociology at the University of Toronto.

In 1962, he was the first full-time director of the Ontario Human Rights Commission. In 1972, he became Ontario Human Rights Commissioner. In 1973, he resigned to found his own human rights consulting firm. From 1984 to 1989, he was the Ontario Ombudsman.

He founded the Ontario Black History Society. In 1981, he published the book, The Freedom Seekers: Blacks in Early Canada.

In 1993, he was awarded the Order of Ontario. In 1999, he was made an Officer of the Order of Canada.

References

 
 Daniel Grafton Hill, at The Canadian Encyclopedia
 The Freedom-Seekers: Blacks in Early Canada, Daniel G. Hill, Stoddart Publishing Co. Ltd., 34 Lesmill Rd., Toronto, Ontario M3B 2T6

External links
CBC The Hour Interview, June 10, 2009.
Order of Canada Citation
The Freedom-Seekers: The Life and Times of Daniel G. Hill, online exhibit on Archives of Ontario website
Daniel G. Hill fonds, Archives of Ontario
MCNEIL, DANIEL. Ushering Children Away from a ‘Light Grey World’: Dr. Daniel Hill III and His Pursuit of a Respectable Black Canadian Community. Ontario History 99, no. 1 (2007): 96–106.

1923 births
2003 deaths
Writers from Independence, Missouri
American emigrants to Canada
Black Canadian activists
Canadian civil servants
Canadian male non-fiction writers
Canadian sociologists
Howard University alumni
Members of the Order of Ontario
Officers of the Order of Canada
Writers from Toronto
University of Toronto alumni
20th-century Canadian historians
Black Canadian scientists